Avington is a village and former civil parish on the River Kennet in West Berkshire, England. Since 1934 it has been part of the parish of Kintbury. The Kennet and Avon Canal follows the river and passes the village.

Toponym
The toponym is derived from Old English and means "the enclosure (tūn) of Afas people". The Domesday Book of 1086 records it as Avintone and a pipe roll from 1167 records it as Avintona.

Parish church
The Church of England parish church of Saints Mark and Luke is an 11th-century Norman building. It consists of only a nave, chancel and late 19th-century north transept. The font is a notable piece of Romanesque sculpture and may be Saxon. The south doorway is a Norman arch. The chancel has Norman vaulting and a Norman arch, both with "beakhead" ornament. A few early Gothic additions to the church were made in the 13th century, including two doorways and a "low-side" window. The church is a Grade I  listed building.

References

Bibliography

External links

Villages in Berkshire
Former civil parishes in Berkshire
Kintbury